Eddie "Lockjaw  Davis with Shirley Scott (also referred to as Moodsville Volume 4) is an album by saxophonist Eddie "Lockjaw" Davis with organist Shirley Scott recorded in 1960 and released on the Moodsville label.

Reception
AllMusic awarded the album 3 stars.

Track listing 
 "Serenade In Blue" (Mack Gordon, Harry Warren) - 4:14
 "It Could Happen to You" (Johnny Burke, Jimmy Van Heusen) - 5:41   
 "What's New?" (Burke, Bob Haggart) - 3:52 
 "I Cover the Waterfront" (Johnny Green, Edward Heyman) - 5:34
 "The Man I Love" (George Gershwin, Ira Gershwin) - 4:18
 "Smoke Gets in Your Eyes" (Otto Harbach, Jerome Kern) - 4:28
 "The Very Thought of You" (Ray Noble) - 6:22
 "Man With a Horn" (Eddie DeLange, Jack Jenney, Bonnie Lake) - 5:27

Personnel 
Eddie "Lockjaw" Davis - tenor saxophone
 Shirley Scott - piano, no organ on this album
 George Duvivier - bass
 Arthur Edgehill - drums

References 

Eddie "Lockjaw" Davis albums
1960 albums
Albums produced by Esmond Edwards
Albums recorded at Van Gelder Studio
Moodsville Records albums
Shirley Scott albums